Photomixing is the generation of continuous wave terahertz radiation from two lasers. The beams are mixed together and focused onto a photomixer device which generates the terahertz radiation.  
It is technologically significant because there are few sources capable of providing radiation in this waveband, others include frequency multiplied electronic/microwave sources, quantum cascade laser and ultrashort pulsed lasers with photoconductive switches as used in terahertz time-domain spectroscopy. The advantages of this technique are that it is continuously tunable over the frequency range from 300 GHz to 3 THz (10 cm−1 to 100 cm−1) (1 mm to 0.1 mm), and spectral resolutions in the order of 1 MHz can be achieved. However, the achievable power is on the order of 10−8 W.

Principle 
Two continuous wave lasers with identical polarisation are required, the lasers with frequency ω1 and ω2 are spatially overlapped to generate a terahertz beatnote. The co-linear lasers are then used to illuminate an ultra fast semiconductor material such as GaAs. The photonic absorption and the short charge carrier lifetime results in the modulation of the conductivity at the desired terahertz frequency ωTHz = ω1 - ω2. An applied electric field allows the conductivity variation to be converted into a current which is radiated by a pair of antenna. A typical photoconductive device or 'photomixer' is made from low temperature GaAs with a patterned metalized layer which is used to form an electrode array and radiating antenna.

High resolution spectrometer 
The photomixing source can then form the basis of a laser spectrometer which can be used to examine the THz signature of various subjects such as gases, liquids or solid materials.

The instrument can be divided into the following functional units:
 Laser sources which provide a THz beatnote in the optical domain. These are usually two near infrared lasers and maybe an optical amplifier.
 The photomixer device converts the beatnote into THz radiation, often emitted into free space by an integrated antenna.
 A THz propagation path, depending on the application suitable focusing elements are used to collimate the THz beam and allow it to pass through the sample under study.
 Detector, with the relatively low levels of available power, in the order of 1 µW, a sensitive detector is required to ensure a reasonable signal to noise ratio. Si bolometers provide a solution for in-coherent instruments. Alternatively a second photomixer device can be used as a detector and has the advantage of allowing coherent detection.

References 
Francis Hindle, Arnaud Cuisset, Robin Bocquet, Gaël Mouret "Continuous-wave terahertz by photomixing: applications to gas phase pollutant detection and quantification" Comptes Rendus Physique (2007), 

Electromagnetic spectrum
Terahertz technology